The fourth season of the American television drama series The Americans, consisting of 13 episodes, premiered on FX on March 16, 2016, and concluded on June 8, 2016. 

The events of the fourth season begin immediately after the events of the last episode of the third season in March 1983 and end on the night of Super Bowl XVIII, January 22, 1984, which Paige and Matthew are watching at Stan's house in the finale.

Cast

Main
 Keri Russell as Elizabeth Jennings (Nadezhda), a KGB officer
 Matthew Rhys as Philip Jennings (Mischa), a KGB officer
 Dylan Baker as William Crandall, a KGB officer biochemical warfare scientist posing as American
 Brandon J. Dirden as FBI agent Dennis Aderholt
 Lev Gorn as Arkady Ivanovich Zotov, the KGB's Resident
 Annet Mahendru as Nina Sergeevna Krilova, a prisoner in the Soviet Union
 Costa Ronin as Oleg Igorevich Burov, a KGB officer
 Keidrich Sellati as Henry Jennings, Elizabeth and Philip's son
 Holly Taylor as Paige Jennings, Elizabeth and Philip's daughter
 Richard Thomas as Agent Frank Gaad, Special Agent In Charge of the FBI Counterintelligence Division
 Alison Wright as Martha Hanson, Agent Gaad's secretary and Philip's informant
 Noah Emmerich as FBI agent Stan Beeman

Recurring
 Michael Aronov as Anton Baklanov, a scientist involved in stealth technology who has been recaptured by the Soviets after defecting
 Kelly AuCoin as Pastor Tim, the head of a church Paige Jennings attends
 Daniel Flaherty as Matthew Beeman, Stan's son
 Vera Cherny as Tatiana Evgenyevna Vyazemtseva, a KGB officer working at the Rezidentura
 Julia Garner as Kimmy Breland, the daughter of the head of the CIA's Afghan group
 Peter Jacobson as Agent Wolfe, Gaad's replacement at the FBI
 Peter Mark Kendall as Hans, a graduate student and KGB informant being trained by Elizabeth
 Boris Krutonog as Igor Burov, Oleg's father.
 Frank Langella as Gabriel, the Jennings' KGB handler
 Margo Martindale as Claudia, the Jennings' KGB supervisor
 Ruthie Ann Miles as Young Hee Seong, a Korean immigrant and Mary Kay consultant whom Elizabeth befriends to gain access to Young Hee's husband 
 Susan Misner as Sandra Beeman, Stan's estranged wife
 Karen Pittman as Lisa, a Northrop employee from whom Elizabeth is gleaning information
 Callie Thorne as Tori, Stan's girlfriend
 Peter Von Berg as Vasili Nikolaevich, a former KGB Resident
 Rob Yang as Don Seong, Young Hee's husband, who is of special interest to the KGB

Production
The series was renewed for a 13-episode fourth season on March 31, 2015. In April 2015, FX announced Frank Langella would continue his recurring role on the series. The season began principal photography on October 13, 2015. Broadway veteran Ruthie Ann Miles was cast as a new acquaintance of one of Elizabeth's guises. Writing for the season had been completed by January 28, 2016; and the final day of filming was March 9, 2016.

Episodes

Reception

Critical response
The fourth season received widespread acclaim from critics. On Rotten Tomatoes, it received a 99 percent approval rating with an average score of 9.2 out of 10 based on 45 reviews, with a critics consensus of: "With its fourth season, The Americans continues to deliver top-tier spy drama while sending its characters in directions that threaten to destroy their freedoms – and their lives." On Metacritic, the season has a score of 95 out of 100 based on 28 reviews, indicating "universal acclaim".

Vikram Murthi of The A.V. Club gave it a perfect "A" grade and wrote, "If the fourth season reminds viewers of anything, it's that The Americans has a masterful control of tone, doling out horror and slow-burn dread like very few of its contemporaries." Ben Travers of Indiewire also gave it an "A" grade and wrote that the season "is on the equally stellar level of its predecessors". Brian Tallerico of RogerEbert.com praised the series and wrote, "It is that depth of character and nuance in the writing that elevates The Americans, along with its willingness to offer stunning narrative developments. [...] I'm now convinced that when we close the final chapter of this televised novel we may finally appreciate one of the best shows we've ever seen."

Maureen Ryan of Variety reviewed the show, praising it for its refusal to go in "cartoonish or preposterous directions" and thereby avoiding becoming one of a "cacophony of shows doing superficially outrageous things for attention". Ryan wrote that it "grows louder by the day" and pointed out that Elizabeth and Philip are now "even more untenable, and the show has never been one to drag out developments past their potency".

Rob Sheffield of Rolling Stone said that "the acting is impeccable" and that it "keeps getting more intense as it goes along, hitting harder than any drama on television right now".

Accolades
For the 32nd TCA Awards, The Americans won for Outstanding Achievement in Drama, was nominated for Program of the Year and Keri Russell was nominated for Individual Achievement in Drama. For the 68th Primetime Emmy Awards, the series received five nominations, for Outstanding Drama Series, Matthew Rhys for Outstanding Lead Actor in a Drama Series, Keri Russell for Outstanding Lead Actress in a Drama Series, and Joel Fields and Joe Weisberg for Outstanding Writing for a Drama Series for the season finale "Persona Non Grata", while Margo Martindale won for Outstanding Guest Actress in a Drama Series. The prior omissions that the show has received at the Emmys was considered to be snubbed by the Emmys in the drama and acting categories by critics.

For both the 7th Critics' Choice Television Awards and 74th Golden Globe Awards, Matthew Rhys and Keri Russell were nominated for Best Actor and Best Actress in a Drama Series, respectively. For the 69th Writers Guild of America Awards, the series won the award for Best Drama Series.

References

External links
 
 

Television series set in 1983
Television series set in 1984
2016 American television seasons
Season 4